The AdventHealth Championship is a Korn Ferry Tour event that was played for the first time in 2009 as the Christmas in October Classic. It has been played at the Nicklaus Golf Club at LionsGate in Overland Park, Kansas and Blue Hills Country Club in Kansas City, Missouri. The tournament took a hiatus in 2010, and returned as the Midwest Classic in 2011 with the Kansas City Crusaders as the host organization. The event was renamed as the KC Golf Classic in 2018.

Winners

Bolded golfers graduated to the PGA Tour via the Korn Ferry Tour regular-season money list. Golfers in bold italics achieved their third win of the season at this tournament and were promoted immediately.

References

External links
 
 Coverage on the Korn Ferry Tour's official site

Korn Ferry Tour events
Golf in Kansas
Sports in the Kansas City metropolitan area
2009 establishments in Kansas
Recurring sporting events established in 2009